Mahmoud Atter Abdel Fattah (born 1938) is an Egyptian athlete. He competed in the men's long jump at the 1960 Summer Olympics.

References

External links
 

1938 births
Athletes (track and field) at the 1960 Summer Olympics
Egyptian male long jumpers
Olympic athletes of Egypt
Sportspeople from Cairo
Living people